Maple Grove is a district (secteur) of the city of Beauharnois, Quebec, which is located on the south shore of the St. Lawrence River in the Montérégie region.

History
As part of the 2000–2006 municipal reorganization in Quebec, the city of Maple Grove and village of Melocheville were amalgamated into the city of Beauharnois on January 1, 2002.

References

External links
 2006 Statistics Canada Community Profile

Former municipalities in Quebec
Populated places disestablished in 2002